Caner Celep (born 21 July 1984) is a Turkish former football midfielder.

External links
 Guardian Stats Centre

1984 births
Footballers from Istanbul
Living people
Turkish footballers
Association football midfielders
Kartalspor footballers
İstanbulspor footballers
Eyüpspor footballers
Maltepespor footballers
Boluspor footballers
Denizlispor footballers
Eskişehirspor footballers
Turgutluspor footballers
Tepecikspor footballers
Süper Lig players
TFF First League players
TFF Second League players